Johns Creek is a stream in Washington County in the U.S. state of Missouri. It is a tributary of Little Lost Creek.

The namesake of Johns Creek is unknown.

See also
List of rivers of Missouri

References

Rivers of Washington County, Missouri
Rivers of Missouri